Oskar Blues Brewery is a craft brewery with locations in Longmont, Colorado, Brevard, North Carolina, and Austin, Texas.  The company began as a brewpub in Lyons, Colorado in 1997 and began brewing beer in the basement in 1999.  In 2002, they became one of the first to put their own craft beer in cans. In 2012, they began marketing some of their craft beer in resealable aluminum containers, and in 2012, they expanded and established another brewery in Brevard, North Carolina.

History
Oskar Blues Original Grill & Brew Restaurant was founded by Dale Katechis in Lyons, Colorado in 1997.  Two years later, he began brewing beer in the basement of the restaurant.

Some credit Oskar Blues as the creator of the "first released canned craft beer in the United States" with the release of their Dale's Pale Ale in November 2002. Other writers point to an earlier beer, Chief Oshkosh Red Lager which was brewed and canned at an existing brewery, as the "first canned craft beer" on June 17, 1991, although its producer, the Mid-Coast Brewing company, closed in 1994.  Four other companies produced canned craft beers prior to Oskar Blues, although the canning was done by larger companies under contract.  Regardless of the first, by 2011 about 50 U.S. craft brewers were issuing craft beer in cans.  In 2009, Oskar Blues Brewery sponsored an event called "Burning Can" which brought together other craft brewers who were using cans for their beers.

In 2012 Oskar Blues Brewery began using resealable aluminum containers for craft beer. Advertising Age named them one of the hottest brands of the year in 2010; Inc. magazine put them on the list of fastest-growing companies and they were featured on the cover of Market Watch magazine.

They are the largest craft brewery (by volume) in the U.S. to abstain from using glass bottles. In 2011, they produced and canned 59,000 barrels of beer. In 2013, they employed over 275 people and distributed to 32 states. The company was ranked Colorado's second largest craft brewery and the 27th largest in the U.S. in 2012. and predicted they would brew 141,000 barrels of beer in 2013.

In 2013, they opened a satellite brewery in Brevard, North Carolina, with an initial production of 40,000 barrels which is capable of being scaled to 85,000.

Forty-five thousand barrels of beer were brewed at the Brevard brewery in 2013, the first full year of production, and the company plans to increase that to 120,000.  The Longmont factory is available for tours, and features the Oskar Blues Tasty Weasel Taproom overlooking the brewery.  The original Oskar Blues Grill and Brew is still located in Lyons, with 45 beers on tap.

In December 2018, Oskar Blues announced the launch of the "first national craft hard seltzer" named Wild Basin Boozy Sparkling Water.

Beers 
Oskar Blues Brewery brews eight year-round production beers, brewed in 100 and 200 barrel batches.  The original brew pub provides a variety of smaller batches for consumption at the Lyons and Longmont locations.

Dale's Pale Ale was Oskar Blues' first beer. It is somewhere between an American pale ale and an India Pale Ale brewed with European malts and American hops. In 2005, Dale's Pale Ale was named "Best Pale Ale by the New York Times.  Esquire magazine selected Dale's as one of the "Best Canned Beers to Drink Now" in a February 2012 article. Dale's is 6.5% alcohol by volume, and features 65 International Bittering Units (IBUs). Dale Katechis first brewed Dale's Pale Ale in his bathtub while a student at Auburn University. In a 2003 interview, Dale confirmed that coworker Brian Lutz formulated the recipe for the beer.
Old Chub is a Scotch ale brewed with seven different malts, including crystal and chocolate malts. Old Chub also gets a dash of beechwood-smoked grains imported from Bamburg, Germany. Old Chub is 8% alcohol by volume. Among other medals, Old Chub won a bronze medal in the 2011 Great American Beer Festival Scotch Ale Category. It was originally named HYA (for "here's your ass") and renamed "Old Chub" when it went into production.
G'Knight is a hybrid version of strong ale, somewhere between an Imperial Red and a Double IPA. Oskar Blues makes it with six different malts and three types of hops, then dry-hopped it with  Amarillo hops. It is 8.7% alcohol by volume, and has 60 International Bittering Units. G'Knight is brewed in tribute to the late Gordon Knight. In addition to opening some of Colorado's first microbreweries, Knight was a Vietnam vet and huge promoter of craft beer. He lost his life in 2002 while fighting a wild fire outside of Lyons, Colorado. In 2013, Oskar Blues Brewery had to change the name of this beer from Gordon Knight to G'Knight following actions from the Gordon Biersch Brewery Restaurant Group seven years after the beer was first produced.
Ten FIDY Imperial Stout is Oskar Blues' seasonal beer with flavors of chocolate, malt, coffee, cocoa and oats. Ten FIDY is 10.5% ABV (hence the name) and is made with two-row malts, chocolate malts, roasted barley, flaked oats and hops with 98 IBUs.
Mama's Little Yella Pils is a small-batch pilsner. Mama's is made with pale malt, German specialty malts, and traditional (Saaz) and 21st century Bavarian hops. It is also fermented at cool temperatures with a German yeast and has 5.3% ABV and 35 IBUs.  Mama's Little Yella Pils won a silver medal in the 2011 Great American Beer Festival Bohemian Style Pilsener Category.
Gubna is an Imperial IPA and is made with 3 malts and Summit hops. Summit hops are also used for post-fermentation dry hopping with 10% ABV and 100 IBUs.
Death by Coconut was re-released by the Tasty Weasel at the Brevard location on Friday, October 14, 2016. http://nctastyweasel.tumblr.com/post/151708815087/more/

See also
 List of microbreweries
 List of breweries in Colorado

References

Further reading
 Beverage World Magazine, September 15, 2008, Volume 127, Issue 9, page 136, 1/3p

External links

 

Restaurants in Colorado
Beer brewing companies based in Colorado
Companies based in Boulder County, Colorado
Restaurants established in 1997
1997 establishments in Colorado